Harpalus triseriatus is a species of ground beetle in the subfamily Harpalinae. It was described by A. Fliescher in 1897.

References

triseriatus
Beetles described in 1897